Llallagua Municipality is the third municipal section of the Rafael Bustillo Province in the Potosí Department in Bolivia. Its seat is Llallagua.

Subdivision 
The municipality consists of the following cantons: 
 Llallagua
 Jachojo

The people 
The people are predominantly indigenous citizens of Quechua and Aymara descent.

References

External links 
Llallagua Municipality: population data and map

Municipalities of Potosí Department